The Rose Mary Crawshay Prize is a literary prize for female scholars, inaugurated in 1888 by the British Academy.

Description

The prize, set up in 1888, is said by the British Academy to be the only UK literary prize specifically for female scholars. Two prizes can be awarded in any year, each "to a woman of any nationality who, in the judgement of the Council of the British Academy, has written or published within three years next preceding the year of the award an historical or critical work of sufficient value on any subject connected with English Literature, preference being given to a work regarding one of the poets Byron, Shelley and Keats". The prize is now "only" £500, but it provides a valuable recognition for non-fiction women writers. It has been awarded since 1916 by the British Academy.

The prize was established by Rose Mary Crawshay as the Byron, Shelley, Keats in Memoriam Prize Fund.

Winners
Winners of the award have been:

See also

 List of literary awards honoring women
 Awards of the British Academy

References

External links
  Includes list of winners since 2000

 
 

Awards established in 1888
1888 establishments in the United Kingdom
British literary awards